Vilhelm Junnila (born 6 March 1982 in Naantali) is a Finnish politician currently serving in the Parliament of Finland for the Finns Party at the Finland Proper constituency.

He was elected to the parliament in 2019 with 10 788 personal votes. He is a member of the Finance Committee and also the chairman of the Finnish delegation to the OSCE Parliamentary Assembly. Junnila is also a member of the Naantali City Council.

References

1982 births
Living people
People from Naantali
Finns Party politicians
Members of the Parliament of Finland (2019–23)